Sadie Maubet Bjornsen (born November 21, 1989) is a retired American cross-country skier and former member of the United States Ski Team Nordic programs "Cross Country A Team" roster.

Her brother Erik Bjornsen is also a cross-country skier.

Athletic career
Bjornsen competed at the 2014 Winter Olympics in Sochi, Russia. In 2015, she graduated from Alaska Pacific University.

Bjornsen has one individual world cup podium and four team world cup podiums: Third in the 5 km in Toblach in 2017, third in the 4 × 5 km relay in Lillehammer in 2013 and 2015, second in the 4 × 5 km relay in Nové Město in 2016, and second in the team sprint at Düsseldorf in 2011.

Bjornsen finished ninth overall in the 2017–18 Tour de Ski, behind teammate Jessie Diggins in third: this was the first time that two Americans finished in the top ten in the race's overall classification.

Cross-country skiing results
All results are sourced from the International Ski Federation (FIS).

Olympic Games

World Championships
1 medal – (1 bronze)

World Cup

Season standings

Individual podiums
7 podiums – (2 , 5 )

Team podiums
5 podiums – (1 , 4 )

References

External links
 
 
 
 

1989 births
Living people
American female cross-country skiers
Cross-country skiers at the 2014 Winter Olympics
Cross-country skiers at the 2018 Winter Olympics
Olympic cross-country skiers of the United States
FIS Nordic World Ski Championships medalists in cross-country skiing
Tour de Ski skiers
People from Omak, Washington
Alaska Pacific University alumni
Sportspeople from Washington (state)
21st-century American women